Narre Warren North is a suburb in Melbourne, Victoria, Australia, 36 km south-east of Melbourne's Central Business District, located within the City of Casey local government area. Narre Warren North recorded a population of 8,033 at the 2021 census.

History

Before the construction of the Gippsland railway line, Narre Warren North was actually the location of the Narre Warren township. The construction of Narre Warren railway station, however, moved the township 2 km to the south, as happened with Upper Beaconsfield, Clyde North and many other townships.

Reflecting this, Narre Warren Post Office opened on 21 January 1869 and in 1900 was renamed Narre Warren North, and Narre Warren Railway Station office (open since 1886) was renamed Narre Warren.

The last few years has seen massive growth in housing in the South East Corridor with new housing estates moving northwards from Narre Warren. The realignment of Hallam - Belgrave Road in the late 1970s bypassed the township and so it has retained a country atmosphere. However, despite the bypassing of the town, in recent years extensive subdivision has taken place throughout the grazing lands. This has increased the number houses nearly a hundredfold.

The town has an IGA store, a Plaza (group of shops), a Primary School and 6 tennis Courts.

Narre Warren North also have a Girl Guide group which caters for girls from 5–17. and a Scout group called 1st Narre Warren North troop on land and in a hall donated to the developing group by a local resident.

There are various religious services with several Christian churches and the Yun Yang Temple off of Reservoir Road.

Small areas of the town were damaged during the Black Saturday bush fires which burnt along the Troups creek towards Narre Warren East and Harkaway.

Narre Warren North used to be a prominent Dairy farming community.

Today

Main Street runs from A'Beckett Road to Tom Jones Court. Claire Robinson park is bound by Main Street, Heatherton Rd and Memorial Drive. The slanted park is used for events such as the annual Carols By Candlelight. Further north-east along Main street is the town plaza containing an IGA supermarket. Opposite the plaza is Winters Lane which contains the preschool and primary school, as well as access to the local tennis club. Since 2016, land has been cleared to extend construction of a housing estate opposite the plaza.

Education

The town contains  Narre Warren North Primary School and an adjacent preschool, and a catholic primary school; Mary Mackillop Primary School located on Ernst Wanke Road. Secondary school students usually attend schools in the surrounding areas of Endeavour Hills, Berwick or Narre Warren.  A new Catholic primary school has commence construction on the corner of A'beckett Road and Belgrave-Hallam Road with students are expected to commence classes in 2017.

Community facilities

Tu An Monastery, a Vietnamese Buddhist temple, is located in the suburb.

Development

During recent years the population of the town has increased dramatically. The largest development is currently along Crawley Road, with blocks ranging from 0.3 to 1 acre. There is also construction taking place between Main Street and Robinsons Rd, including the aforementioned plaza and an extension of Troup Creek.

Homes in Narre Warren North have a median value of $1,203,033 which is very high compared to neighbouring suburbs, Narre Warren (with a median value of $630,000) and Berwick (with a median value of $700,000).

Sport

Berwick City Soccer Club play their home games at Jack Thomas Reserve which is located in the suburb of Narre Warren North. They currently complete in the Victorian State League Division 2 South East.

Narre Warren North Foxes Football Club is a Junior Football Club that is also located in the suburb of Narre Warren North.  They train and play at the Narre Warren North Recreation Reserve located on Belgrave-Hallam Road.

See also
 City of Berwick – Narre Warren North was previously within this former local government area.
 Electoral district of Narre Warren North

References

Suburbs of Melbourne